This is a list of extraterrestrial, supernatural, otherworldly and futuristic items featured in the BBC science-fiction drama Torchwood and its spin-off media.

0-9

3-D glasses
Originally used by the Tenth Doctor in "Doomsday" to detect particles from the void between universes, Jack Harkness now owns a pair which he keeps on his desk ("Small Worlds").

A

Alien knife
See Life knife

Alien pendant
A communication device used by the inhabitants of Mary's home planet of Arcateen 5. It allows the wearer to hear thoughts and feelings of others; it can backfire if the ones the wearer is listening to have terrible secrets. The only known pendant on Earth was destroyed by Toshiko Sato in "Greeks Bearing Gifts". As Tosh pointed out, the only truthful thing Mary said about the pendant is that it can be too much for the wearer to handle.

Amnesia pill
Amnesia pills to cause someone to forget recent memories. The amnesia can be cured if the person's memories are triggered by one specific image (and if they are intelligent enough). Jack used this on Gwen Cooper after she first learned about the Torchwood Hub. It contains a special compound known as B67 or Retcon (in reference to retroactive continuity). The website reveals the pills were developed by Torchwood One under Yvonne Hartman, as well as several details about its effectiveness. 2 oz of B67 is only sufficient to cause mild confusion in young children (6–7), with 4 oz being able to cause memory loss in older persons (61–64), and 8 oz is sufficient to cause memory loss in people in their late 20s although in one instance, caused a stress-induced heart attack in a 64-year-old man. Gwen Cooper feeds Rhys retcon whilst confessing her affair with Owen, so that he will not remember. It is revealed in "End of Days" that those dismissed from Torchwood are "Retconned" within 24 hours. Other suggested names for the compound included Goldfish and Scooter.

Jack appears to have a supply of, or made, his own Retcon during the events of Season Four - "Miracle Day". He drugged Esther with it, only for it to prove pointless in the following episode where she is forced to join Torchwood, and someone from the Three Families that was spying on Gwen to see if she had any contact with Jack.

The Amok
The Amok is a multi-dimensional coin-shaped item which appears to be a recreational game for an alien race. As humans only operate within a four-dimensional world, the incomprehensible dimensions of the Amok cause surrounding humans to go mad with desire to take their turn playing. When in possession of the Amok, humans talk unintelligibly about things being "big big big" and witness blue lights behind their eyelids. The madness is so acute that humans can kill each other or themselves in an attempt to take their turn. When the Torchwood team encounter the Amok in the novel Border Princes by Dan Abnett, they are also affected by it, but eventually manage to contain it safely behind a physical firewall; it is subsequently destroyed in the same novel by Mr Dine.

Anti-Cyberman Special Weapons
Anti-Cyberman Special Weapons are special rifles designed and developed by scientists from the Parallel Torchwood to fight the Cybermen, and brought to Earth during the Cyberman Invasion, subsequently being retained by Torchwood in case the Cybermen ever return from the void. Torchwood Three has a supply of these weapons in the Weapons Room (which was sealed during the event caused by Cyberwoman Lisa Hallett, where cutting off the Hub's power supply caused the facility to go into lockdown and prevent access to the weapons). An aesthetically similar weapon, possibly an upgraded version, of the anti-cyber weaponry was seen and fired in the Doctor Who episode "A Nightmare in Silver."

Anti-Droon audio paddle
A plastic paddle that, when held to the forehead of a Droon host, ejects the Droon forcibly through the nostril of the victim. The paddle is used in the Torchwood spin-off novel Border Princes by Dan Abnett.

Antitoxin Kit
A piece of human-made technology created by Torchwood in response to numerous encounters with alien contagions and diseases. In "Kiss Kiss, Bang Bang", Owen Harper used one of the kits to save Gwen Cooper from death by Captain John Hart's lip-gloss toxin.

Anti-Weevil clamps
A piece of metal tape that, when wound round a captive's ankles or wrists, then pressed together, would meld into an unbreakable loop, mimicking a pair of handcuffs. The loop can only be broken by irradiating it with low-level microwaves. Though called Anti-Weevil clamps, they can be used on people or other aliens.

Anti-Weevil spray
A spray that causes short term pain to Weevils, allowing them to be subdued in a similar manner to the use of pepper spray on humans. It is first seen in "Everything Changes". However, by "Combat", the Weevils appear to be gaining an immunity to it.

Atom accelerator
An essential component of the Eleventh Doctor's TARDIS from "The Eleventh Hour" until "The Angels Take Manhattan". A similar-looking item can be seen in Torchwood's headquarters in "Day One", "Greeks Bearing Gifts" and "Random Shoes", all of which predate this prop's first appearance on Doctor Who.

B

Bekaran deep-tissue scanner
An X-ray device of alien-origin used by Owen in his medical analysis. It is capable of producing a photo-realistic X-ray on a tiny screen on the device, that can be viewed at any depth by adjusting the resolution. It appears in the novels Another Life, Border Princes and Slow Decay. It also appears in the radio play "Lost Souls".

Binoculars
Jack still has the futuristic binoculars that he used in the Doctor Who episode "The Empty Child".

Black Tile
A piece of alien exotic technology that has been in Jack Harkness's possession since he joined Torchwood. Its function remains mostly unknown, but is assumed to be a form of early warning system. It was seen in Border Princes.

Brudyac psychic receiver
A small, spherical item, chrome in colour, inserted into the spine of any creature that the Brudyac wishes to control. It allows a Brudyac to take psychic control of the victim, with the only disadvantage being that it uses up the spinal fluid of the victim, requiring them to drink more. The device also injects the Brudyac's food source into the victim's stomach, where it grows. In the novel Another Life by Peter Anghelides, several characters have this device implanted into their spines, among them, Owen and Jack.

C

Compact M1911
A .45 Caliber handgun used by everyone but Jack Harkness on the Torchwood team, the gun is a modern variant of the Colt Government M1911 model. It features a lightweight design while still packing a large amount of firepower.

Contact lenses
Special contact lenses which allow Torchwood headquarters to see everything the wearer sees. It also has special lip-reading technology to simulate hearing for the viewer, but only when lips are sufficiently visible. The wearer can receive instant messages from HQ. It was worn by Martha Jones in "Reset" to infiltrate the Pharm. In "Children of Earth", it was worn first by Lois Habiba to allow Torchwood to spy on negotiations between the British government and the 456 and then by Bridget Spears to gather information to force Prime Minister Brian Green out of office after his failures in handling the situation. It works by exploiting a solution to the EPR Paradox which is a supposed problem in the quantum theory relating to one of the three states of quantum particles, entanglement (See Quantum Physics). They are powered by body heat, so they only work when you wear them (Reset). Also, the contact lenses are untraceable by human technology (Reset and Children of Earth).

In Children of Earth (2009), Gwen, Rhys and Ianto share a moment of embarrassment after realising that they'd all used the Contact Lenses for "personal use". In Miracle Day (2011), they are given the name Eye-5 lenses; Gwen says they are the only piece of Torchwood technology they managed to keep following the events of Children of Earth. In "Escape to L.A.", they were used in reverse; projecting an image of a PhiCorp executive's eye over Gwen's to spoof iris recognition. In "The Middle Men", Gwen uses them to record her blowing up a concentration camp in Wales; later, they are hacked into by Olivia Colasanto to tell Gwen that her family has been kidnapped and that she must deliver Jack. Rex subsequently uses them in "End of the Road" to record Brian Friedkin's confession.

Cryo-chamber
Used by Torchwood to store corpses indefinitely. One of its uses is to provide corpses which can be disfigured and dumped to provide identifiable bodies for people who have been vapourised, eaten or otherwise destroyed by aliens ("Day One"). The source of the bodies is unclear. The body of Suzie Costello was seen being placed in storage at the end of "Everything Changes" and it has been used since on several occasions including when Jack is thought to be dead in "End of Days" and in "Exit Wounds".

Cyber-conversion unit
Scavenged by Ianto Jones from the ruins of Torchwood One and installed in the basement of the Hub. It was modified following the instructions of Lisa Hallett, a partially converted Cyberman, to become a life support system for her. It was still somewhat operational and was used to attempt to upgrade Dr Tanizaki but resulted in only his death. It was also used to transplant the brain of Lisa into the body of another woman. When used to upgrade it caused a huge power drain on the Hub ("Cyberwoman").

D

Dalek-enhanced Thompson submachine guns
First seen in the Doctor Who episode "Evolution of the Daleks" and an amalgamation of the Dalek Gun with 1930s weapon technology, these weapons were carried by Dalek-controlled Humans and were powerful enough to penetrate Dalek armour and kill the mutants inside. A couple of these weapons can be seen in the weapons section of Torchwood Three in "Adam".

Data scanning device
Described by Toshiko Sato as an "iPod for books", the scanner can be passed across any book in order to take digital images of the pages inside. Toshiko hypothesises that it was left behind by alien archaeologists, so that they could decode documents on the voyage home. The same prop was also used in "Cyberwoman" as a lockpick device. In "Dead Man Walking", the item showcases new functions – Toshiko has discovered that it is capable of recording a foreign language from the Torchwood CCTV and translating it to English.

Decontamination sponge
Described only as looking like a "squat loofah" by Gwen, this item can decontaminate up to six different types of nuclear radiation. Because of its effectiveness, Jack has to store it in a lead box at all times when it is not being used. When Owen becomes contaminated in Another Life, he uses the Decontamination sponge to soak up the radiation.

The Depressor
An alien device salvaged by Torchwood in 1952. It is mentioned on the Torchwood website in a diary fragment of a past Torchwood Three agent. Torchwood team members theorised the device was transmitting a message, not through language but through emotion, and the message was spreading quickly and causing disastrous results all around Cardiff. The device itself directly affected anybody within 40 yards of it, driving them slowly mad. It was named "The Depressor" by one of the scientists studying it. It was filed away in their equipment stores soon after, with a decision on its fate pending.

Direction-Finder
The Direction-Finder is a special tracking system built by Torchwood's scientists and augmented with alien technology. It is described as an improved version of GPS, and a version of the device was installed for usage in the Torchwood SUV.

Dogon Eyes
The thirteen eyes of a reptilian race, the Dogon. Dr. Rajesh Singh under Director Yvonne Hartman of Torchwood One did some research into the sixth eye and was able to identify that it exerts an influence on one who holds it; particularly if ingested, enabling them to look back over their lives with a fresh perspective. In the episode "Random Shoes", Eugene Jones is shown to have come to possess a sixth eye from a teacher who found it after it fell from the sky. After ingesting the eye and dying, Eugene steadily gained more physical contact with the world in his "ghostly" state until he became corporeal and visible once more. He was then surrounded by a white glow and floated upward, seemingly vanishing into space. Another eye was mentioned to be owned by Henry Parker, the collector of alien artifacts seen in the episode "A Day in the Death".

E

Earpieces
Bluetooth attachments that act as standard communications devices for Torchwood personnel. One type of earpiece was seen in "Army of Ghosts" and "Doomsday" and were altered by the Cybermen to control three reanimated technicians and manipulate them into opening the breach. Another variant was seen throughout the series and worn by all members of Torchwood Three when in the field, used for communication. The design of the earpieces has changed between the two series and they do not even appear in the third.

EMP Gun
An EMP gun features in the Torchwood comic, Jetsam.

F

Firing Stock 15 Rifles
First seen in Doctor Who episodes "The Impossible Planet"/"The Satan Pit", and later in the background of Torchwood episode "Day One", these are fictional projectile weapons used by the Human Empire in the distant future. These rifles are based on P-90s but fire ammunition that is designed to only impact on organic-based targets, preventing accidents in hostile environments. An expedition of the "Torchwood Archives" who landed to conduct investigations on a planet on the other side of the galaxy, had several security guards bearing FS-15 Rifles, and used them to great effect against their rebelling Ood population. These presumably fell through the Rift and were salvaged.

G

G36c Assault Rifle
The German made assault rifle made by H&K used by various characters which is featured in the doctor who episodes "Journey's end" and "The Last of the Time Lords".

Gas masks
Gas masks from the Doctor Who episodes "The Empty Child" and "The Doctor Dances" can be seen in the Hub. Although supposedly World War II-era masks, they were specially designed by the Doctor Who production team for those episodes and are not replicas of any period equipment.

Ghost Machine
An alien device appearing in "Ghost Machine", containing nanotechnological quantum transducers that can convert emotional energy left over from significant events into visions of those events. One half of the device allows the user to see the past, while the other allows them to see the future. Jack's report on the Torchwood Institute website speculates that it belonged to a "transdimensional being" that used it like a GPS receiver, locking on to significant events to locate itself while traveling in time and space. Another memo on the website shows that the team believed that the "ghost shifts" created by Torchwood One in "Army of Ghosts" made it easier for such residual memory "ghosts" to manifest themselves (although actually they were simply helping Cybermen from a parallel universe to enter the world).

Gizmo
A device similar to the Sonic Screwdriver in function, Gwen used this in Children of Earth to deactivate CCTV cameras. It is a pen-size device with a glowing blue tip. She first used it whilst interviewing Clement McDonald (during which Gwen says that the technical term for the device is a Gizmo), and later during the rescue of Captain Jack. It is not shown to have any other function.

Goldenrod Device
The Goldenrod Device is a self-reconfiguring piece of alien technology that fell through the Rift and was confiscated by Torchwood Three personnel. Toshiko Sato spent 72 hours analyzing it to discover its purpose, but failed due to its unique nature. The device later broke free, and started affecting people at random by melting their limbs together, revealing its true purpose as a weapon. Torchwood promptly launched "Operation Goldenrod" with the objective of stopping the device and repairing the damage. Owen Harper was charged with damage control and attempted to repair people's bodies through surgeries and medical techniques, but most of the victims never fully recovered due to scarring and disfigurement. The device also exhibited some sort of influence on its victims that drove them mad, forcing Sato to kill one in self-defense. This was her first kill, alien or otherwise, in the line of service for the Institute. Jack Harkness eventually found a way to destroy the device, but it caused a more violent side of his nature to surface, severely affecting the team's view of him. The remnants of the device and associated materials of Operation Goldenrod were then moved back to the Hub and stored in a specially lined chamber inside the facility. Goldenrod has been periodically mentioned throughout the series' first three novels, but its true nature was not revealed until Slow Decay.

H

HD CCTV
First seen in "Day One", the scanner uses alien technology to convert a raster CCTV image into a smooth vector image, which can then be magnified in order to identify face shapes.

Hologram Projectors
Light emitters that form an illusionary environment around the viewer. These were referenced in the novel Another Life as an interface between Owen Harper and the MMOG game "Second Reality". The projectors appear to be all over the Hub and were improved by Toshiko Sato to photo-like-quality and it is revealed the projectors could be used for training exercises and recruiting new members for Torchwood Three.

Hyperspectral Scanner
The Hyperspectral Scanner is an alien examination tool that was used by Toshiko Sato to examine new pieces of alien technology salvaged by Torchwood Three personnel.

I

Invisible lift
A lift which runs from the Hub to the Roald Dahl Plass. Any person standing on the lift cannot be seen, due to the presence of a "perception filter" that was caused by a "dimensionally transcendental chameleon circuit placed right here on this spot which welded its perception properties to a spatial-temporal rift." In subsequent Doctor Who episodes ("The Sound of Drums" and "Last of the Time Lords"), the Doctor uses the TARDIS to apply perception filters to TARDIS keys owned by Jack and Martha, and also his own key, to allow a simulated invisibility. The perception filter concept was later used in various future Doctor Who episodes, such as "The Eleventh Hour", "The Vampires of Venice" and "The Lodger".

J

Jamolean Lance
An alien energy weapon used by Toshiko Sato in the Torchwood novel Pack Animals. It has a rechargeable power pack for mobility and works more like a gun than an actual lance. In order to operate the weapon's barrel must be thrust into/up against an enemy then the trigger pulled, like a close range rifle. The weapon then starts off an exothermic reaction i.e. it burns the foe. Tosh used it in order to reduce dangerous Diplodocus that had materialised in the Hub into a smoldering heap.

L

Laser Gun
The Laser Gun is an alien weapon that fell through the Rift and was confiscated by Torchwood Three personnel. It was tested in the Hub's firing range before being filed away among the Hub's equipment stores.

Life Knife
A three-bladed knife used by Suzie Costello to kill people to test the Resurrection Gauntlet in "Everything Changes". After Suzie's suicide, the knife was placed in a box in Jack's safe sealed with a "NOT FOR USE" tag. The knife is associated with the glove as they are made of the same metal, and also those killed with the knife are easier for the Glove to resurrect. Stabbing the deceased with the knife can increase the connection with the glove even post mortem. The name "life knife" was coined by Ianto Jones.

Lockpick
An alien lockpicking device, capable of opening any lock in 45 seconds. The device appears to use the same prop as the data scanner when shown in "Cyberwoman", but in later episodes appears to use a more distinguishable prop.

Laser Saw
A laser saw is a piece of technology acquired by Torchwood Three. It is unknown whether it was a piece of alien technology that fell through the Cardiff rift, or if it was created by Torchwood Three themselves. The laser saw appears to be handy for medical purposes. The device is able to not only open up flesh with virtually no mess, but can also reattach it with no visible signs afterwards.

In 2009, Captain Jack Harkness and Ianto Jones used the laser saw to open up a dead body and retrieve a seemingly harmless alien from inside that released morphine into the body. A few hours later, Agent Johnson took the saw from Harkness and opened up his stomach to place a small but powerful bomb inside him while he was temporarily deceased. The bomb would later detonate, destroying the Captain temporarily and the Hub.

M

Meteorite core
The core of the meteorite from which the "sex gas" emerged. It was taken back to the Hub for analysis.

Miniature CAT scanner
A miniature CAT scanner used by the team to analyse the inside of alien devices.

Mind Probe
A piece of alien technology used to pry into the deeper levels of a human mind or body, used in interrogative purposes to find out information or to uncover a person's true nature. In the case of humans, the backlash caused by the process not only exacts physical and mental anguish, but if the process goes on too long or too hard, then the person's head completely explodes; (this happened to an alien it was last used on which was mentioned to have high blood pressure compared to humans.) In "Sleeper", the Mind Probe was used reluctantly to successfully discover Beth's true identity.

Mirrored box
A portable alien prison that was used by Toshiko to capture an alien radiance sprite. It was mentioned in the novel Another Life.

Phone Line Jammer
This piece of human technology renders all telecommunications in the area useless, eliminating exterior contact and making sure agencies such as the police cannot be notified. The device is used when there is an alien in a controlled environment; the humans are retconned later.

O

Organic computer
Referred to as such only on the Torchwood website, the computer used in the Hub is in fact alive. According to the website, the computer "is as old as Torchwood itself – a piece of organic, living, intuitive technology light years ahead of anything on Earth. It salvaged what it could, and continues at the heart of our work today." The computer managed to salvage information from the fall of Torchwood One, and is capable of incredible intuitive feats such as individual tracking, weather monitoring, GPS-navigation and the detection of all things extraterrestrial. The computer has been visible several times on the series, where it is shown (as it seen on the Adobe Flash version of the website) to be a pulsating, blue mass with many tentacles networking various pieces of information. In "They Keep Killing Suzie", it is established that the computer's membrane can still recognise commands even without power. In "Captain Jack Harkness", Owen is confident that the computer's artificial intelligence is smart enough to not require precise codes, and in "End of Days", it requests retinal scans to operate the Rift Manipulator. After the Hub is destroyed in Children of Earth, the team are able to get the organic software running on their laptops.

P

Perfume
A Huon (or possibly Artron) Particle perfume used by Owen in "Everything Changes" that makes the user irresistibly attractive to anyone, male or female. He was using it recreationally without Torchwood's permission and gave it back at the end of the episode. This has drawn criticism from some viewers who have likened it to date rape.

Personal digital assistant
Torchwood Three personnel possess specialised PDAs, seen in "Cyberwoman" and later mentioned in the novel Another Life.

Personal Geiger Counters
Pocket calculator-sized Geiger counters used by Torchwood in the novel Another Life.

Personal Teleportation Device
See Vortex Manipulator

Physical firewall
A specially made barrier to contain hazardous alien objects or materials salvaged by Torchwood. It was mentioned in the novel Border Princes as The Amok was stored behind a physical firewall to contain its psychotic influence on all humans around it.

Portable Meson Gun
An alien weapon whose components and designs somehow made its way to the Internet upon reaching Cardiff through the Rift. In Border Princes, an auto mechanic in Grangetown blogged to find out how to make one of the guns in Sumerian. Fortunately, this was discovered by Toshiko Sato, who reported it to Jack Harkness who, recognizing the seriousness of this claim, said he would "look into it".

Portable prison cell
A small device which can create a blue force field around any object, acting as a portable prison cell. The device only has a battery life of one hour. The blue energy field produced by the device resembles the effect from the Chula tractor beam used by Jack Harkness in the Doctor Who episodes "The Empty Child" and "The Doctor Dances".

Power generators
A form of machinery used in all Torchwood facilities to generate electrical power. In "Cyberwoman", Lisa Hallett recharged herself by draining Torchwood Three's power supply through her Cyber-conversion unit.

Preachers' rifles
Weapons used by the Preachers (Pete, Jake and Mickey/Ricky) on a parallel Earth. These use the emotional inhibitor disabler code in a weaponised fashion and are extremely effective against Cybermen. They have a similar effect on Daleks. These were brought to Rose's Earth by the Preachers, now in control of their parallel Torchwood One in "Doomsday" to fight the invading Cybermen. These are later seen in the background of the Hub in "Greeks Bearing Gifts".

Protein sauce
First seen in "Cyberwoman", where it is referred to as "bar-b-que sauce," protein sauce is a special enzyme which helps the Pterodactyl identify its food.

Proton Blaster
The Proton Blaster is an alien weapon that fell through the Rift and was confiscated by Torchwood Three personnel. It was tested in the Hub's firing range before being filed away among the Hub's equipment stores.

The Pulse
Recovered from the collection of alien fanatic Henry Parker, the Pulse resembles a glowing red-and-black meteor in its dormant state. Parker believed that it was a healing device that kept him alive despite his ill health, but, as Owen Harper later learnt, it was actually a message sent by a race who had received one of Earth's past transmitted attempts to discover proof of extra-terrestrial life, containing a message that is somehow "displayed" through a brilliant light show that is generated by the Pulse when it reaches full power.

R

Range Rover
See SUV

Resurrection Gauntlet

A metal gauntlet (also known as The Glove and jokingly dubbed the Risen Mitten by Ianto Jones) with the ability to bring the dead back to life for a limited time, as seen in "Everything Changes". The glove fell through the rift circa 1967 and rested on the bottom of Cardiff Bay until Torchwood Three dredged it in early 2007. It has a strange but unspecified connection to a knife made of the same metal. The Torchwood Institute website details the testing of the glove, and that Suzie was buying goldfish in bulk and killing them to test the Glove. Suzie's research showed that the glove was slightly radioactive and that the glove possesses "low psych levels" which allows it to directly respond to brain activity. It was later established it has an empathic link with its wearer, like "a rope from [the] heart to the glove" and that transfers the life force of the wearer to keep the dead alive. The Glove is more effective on recent, violent trauma victims, prompting Suzie Costello to murder several Cardiff residents in order to improve her proficiency in using it. Following Suzie's suicide, the Glove is placed in Jack's safe and sealed with a "NOT FOR USE" tag.

In "They Keep Killing Suzie", it is used to bring Suzie back to life. Jack reveals that the glove was recovered from Cardiff Bay 40 years prior, and theorises that whoever owned it wanted to be rid of it.  Gwen is the only one with the degree of empathy required to operate the glove without Suzie.  When the glove was used on Suzie by Gwen it worked the same way as before, keeping her alive for the allotted amount of time however, when Gwen felt her begin to slip away she tried to forcefully bring her back and succeeded... but at a price.  Gwen's forced attempt to keep Suzie alive established a non-physical connection between the two with Suzie slowly draining Gwen's life force, healing Suzie and killing Gwen. Gwen gradually developed the same wound as Suzie, in the same place (i.e. gunshot wound in the back of the head) and this would have caused Gwen's death if the Glove was not destroyed in time (which Tosh did by shooting it), thereby reviving Gwen and killing Suzie. Again. However, Ianto points out that "gloves come in pairs", implying that there may be another glove.

The second glove appears in the episode "Dead Man Walking", in which it is retrieved from St. Mary's church where the Weevils had established a colony. It is used to revive Owen Harper, who had died from a gunshot wound in the previous episode. This glove appears to have the same powers, except Jack can use it, implying that the glove works best on those the wearer is emotionally involved with. The power that brings Owen back to life however seems to imbue the glove with a mind of its own and during an attempt to embalm Owen, the glove attacks the team; mainly Martha Jones, who is aged by the assault. The second glove was destroyed by a gunshot from Owen (just as the first one was by Tosh) and was not seen or mentioned after that in the episode. While the first Glove existed, Suzie could not be killed just as Owen could not. However, she showed the ability to heal – rapidly – and after her Glove was destroyed she died. Owen, however, never healed after resuscitation and continued to live after his Glove was destroyed.

Before the Glove was used on Owen, it had been discovered many centuries ago (around the time of the black plague) in Wales by a priest, who attempted to use it on a little girl called Faith.

Notably, Rassilon wears a similar-looking glove in "The End of Time", using it as a lethal weapon.

Retcon
Retroactive continuity—see Amnesia pill

Rift Manipulator
First seen in "Captain Jack Harkness" and again in "End of Days", the Rift Manipulator is a device at the Torchwood Hub which manipulates the Rift. With the use of very precise co-ordinates and algebra, it can be used safely to negotiate minor time travel, but it is incredibly dangerous. Improper usage could cause "fractures in time" with apocalyptic results and due to a "preshock" of the "End of Days" events it has many precautions surrounding its usage, including retinal scans of all Torchwood staff in order to facilitate a full opening of the Rift. It should also be noted that the main part of the manipulator is very similar to the central column of the TARDIS console. In the Doctor Who series, it was used in the episode "The Stolen Earth" to boost the signal of a distress call to the Doctor and was then used in the following episode "Journey's End" to help the TARDIS drag the Earth back into its regular orbit.

S

Severed hand
See also List of Doctor Who items#Severed hand

After the Tenth Doctor's hand was severed by a sword during the Sycorax invasion of Earth ("The Christmas Invasion"), the hand was recovered by Jack Harkness. It is stored in a transparent case filled with a preservative liquid. Jack is very protective of the hand, saying that it means something only to him. In "End of Days", the hand glows when the TARDIS is nearby. In the Doctor Who episode, "Utopia", where Jack refers to the hand as a "Doctor detector", the hand is stolen by the Master. The hand is subsequently recovered by the Doctor.

Silver Flask
The ghostly "Night Travellers" escape from their film imprisonment in "From Out of the Rain" and begin stealing peoples "last breaths" for their own travelling show audience, leaving the victims in a cataleptic state with only a heartbeat but no breath. Just as the ghosts are dispatched the "Ghostmaker" throws the open silver flask and, despite Ianto's quick catch, most of the human souls are lost in the air, so the affected victims of Cardiff die, all except for one child. The silver flask ends up being stored by Jack in his safe at Torchwood.

Singularity Scalpel
In the episode "Reset", Jack cautions Owen in using this alien artifact. The item concentrates energy on an object without damaging anything on the way, for example a piece of paper within a plastic cup. At first, most of Owen's attempts to master the device were unsuccessful, but he manages to save Martha Jones by vapourising the alien mayfly within her at the episode's conclusion. It is later used by Rhys in "Something Borrowed", by which he successfully removes the alien baby from within Gwen's womb. In the series two alternate reality game on BBC Torchwood, an online singularity scalpel game features as part of a mission which involves scanning a body.  It also appears in Risk Assement.

Sonic Screwdriver
Captain Jack is seen using what resembles the Doctor's sonic screwdriver without the noise in the episode "Day One".

Species Database
Torchwood Three's main database on encountered or catalogued alien species. The database is stored and accessed in the Hub. In "Kiss Kiss, Bang Bang", Gwen Cooper, de facto leader following Jack Harkness's apparent desertion, ordered it updated with the new information taken by Toshiko Sato in regards to the Blowfish.

Stop watch
Ianto Jones' favorite piece of equipment. It is first seen in the episode "They Keep Killing Suzie" and is the first hint of a sexual relationship between Captain Jack Harkness and Ianto Jones. Ianto says in "Kiss, Kiss, Bang, Bang" That he always has the stopwatch

Sub Etheric Resonator
An alien weapon confiscated and kept in the Hub. In "Sleeper", Beth was attracted to the weapon (secretly because of her intelligence-gathering mission), but was stopped from collecting data on it by Ianto Jones.

SUV

The Torchwood vehicle is a converted large, black Range Rover Vogue with tinted windows and blue lights running along the A pillars. The vehicle has a white-on-black non-standard typeface for the registration plate, usually found only on military vehicles and vehicles from before 1973 on British car number plates, and its registration number, CF06 FDU (indicating the vehicle was registered in Cardiff between March and September 2006), does not appear in the DVLA vehicle register ("Everything Changes"). It contains computers that can connect to the Torchwood Hub and to various databases, including those operated by the police. One such database, featured in the novel Slow Decay, allows Torchwood to change the traffic lights so that they are on green before they reach them. Although the vehicle is routinely referred to as an SUV, this is not a common designation in British English.

The SUV was stolen during the events of Children of Earth by bullies.
The SUV was also stolen in "Countrycide" Episode 6.

During an auction of Torchwood and Doctor Who props, the SUV was sold for £18,000.

T

TARDIS
The Doctor's TARDIS is heard from offscreen in "End of Days".

TARDIS coral
Jack has a piece of coral growing in his office which actor John Barrowman identifies as being a piece of the same substance as the TARDIS. Barrowman suggests (as did the Tenth Doctor in "The Impossible Planet") that TARDISes are "grown, not built". The piece in Jack's office has been there for approximately 30 years, and in 500 years the "carving process" begins.

Telepathy pendant
See Alien pendant

Television sets
The Hub contains three television sets from Magpie Electricals, seen in the Doctor Who episode "The Idiot's Lantern". Jack uses them as scanners for unusual signals.

Time Lock
A defence mechanism implemented by Toshiko Sato that seals the Torchwood Hub in a protective bubble that stops anything getting in or out. It is seen in the Doctor Who episode "Journey's End" when a Dalek attempts to gain entrance, activated when the Dalek is fired upon by Gwen Cooper and Ianto Jones. The Dalek is immediately frozen in time. Anything that threatens to break the lock is automatically caught in it.  However, during the Other Doctor's genocide of the Daleks, the force of the trapped Dalek's explosion broke the Time Lock, destroying it beyond repair.

As a result, during the events of "Children of Earth" the time lock failed to protect the Hub from destruction.

Time Agent Wrist-Strap
A 51st Century multi-purpose wrist-mounted device worn and operated by Jack Harkness. The range and limits of the device are unknown, though it is known it can function as a remote control, a short-distance communication device (including a built-in holographic projector which also allows voicemail) and a personal teleporter. It also had a Vortex Manipulator built-in to allow time travel (though jumping approximately 198,231 years caused it to burn out). At the end of "Last of the Time Lords" The Doctor disables Jack's Vortex Manipulator but left the device's other functions intact. Jack's former colleagues, including Captain John Hart also carry Time Agent Wrist-Straps. Jack got his wrist-strap to work as a teleporter again in the Doctor Who episode "The Stolen Earth", only for the Doctor to deactivate it once more in "Journey's End". It is revealed in "Children of Earth" that the wriststrap is practically indestructible, having survived an explosion that destroyed the Torchwood Hub. In "Rendition" it is also shown to warn of any current health issues of the wearer, at least warning of a low sodium content with an annoying beeping.

Torchwood server
A computer-control mechanism that regulates all computer use for Torchwood personnel. These appear to be far superior to public servers as Toshiko Sato mentioned in the novel Another Life that Owen Harper's new game "Second Reality" could only be played when the game was logged through the Hub's server; this implies that Torchwood's special servers can prevent back-tracing of any kind and protect private information.

Torchwood Stun Gun
The Torchwood team possess a specially designed stun gun engineered for use on humans and aliens alike. It has both "stun" and "kill" settings.

Torchwood Sub
The Torchwood Sub appears in the novel Another Life and in the episode "Fragments". It is held in one of the many entrances to the Hub. According to Jack, it only carries two people.

Tracking system
The Hub has technology capable of detecting and following creatures and objects of alien origin, as seen in "Ghost Machine". It does so by providing an overhead-view, wireframe map of Cardiff, with the target and active Torchwood agents displayed. However, it can only detect the target's position and not its appearance, size or nature

Two person transporter ship
The ship arrived in the 19th century with Mary and her guard. It came into Torchwood's possession in "Greeks Bearing Gifts". It can be reprogrammed to send someone anywhere, for example, the Sun.

U

Unknown Gun
A cannon-like gun that appears in the episode "Something Borrowed" in the possession of Captain Jack, who removes it from the back of the SUV before pursuing the Nostrovite. The unnamed gun apparently causes biological targets to self-combust.

Universal Remote Control
Featured in the Torchwood radio play "Asylum", a Universal Remote Control is a future earth made tool for interacting with various pieces of technology. In the future, it is used for buying items from shops, and used much like a scanner in today's supermarkets. In the present day, it can interfere with different objects depending on its setting. It can open car windows, turn traffic lights red, shut down servers, etc. It makes a different noise, much like a toy gun, depending on what setting it is on.

V

Virtual reality helmets
These are interface devices capable of digital entry into a computer system. Owen Harper used one of these in the novel Another Life to enter the MMO game "Second Reality".

Vortex manipulator
Jack Harkness has a personal teleporter built into his wrist device. The device is effective over distances in excess of several hundred miles, having been used to transport three people from London to a flying aircraft carrier over international waters roughly 700 miles away in Doctor Who episode "The Sound of Drums" (2007). However, its teleportation capabilities were disabled. In the Doctor Who/Torchwood crossover "The Stolen Earth"/"Journey's End" (2008), the device's teleportation facility was unlocked and subsequently disabled once again. It survives the explosion of the Hub in Children of Earth (2009) and remains in Jack's possession in Miracle Day. As of "The Day of the Doctor", however, it has been in UNIT's possession since one of Jack's deaths. Clara Oswald obtains the device and, provided with the activation code by the Eleventh Doctor, uses it to reunite with the Doctor in Elizabethan England. In "The Witch's Familiar", the female incarnation of the Master known as Missy also utilizes vortex manipulators while traveling with Clara Oswald, but they are burned out. In "Revolution of the Daleks," Jack is shown to have somehow reacquired his vortex manipulator and repaired the teleport function. Jack uses his vortex manipulator to break the Thirteenth Doctor out of prison and to board and destroy a Dalek ship. Vortex manipulators are also a device favored by River Song as a form of time travel in her younger years, although, as seen in "The Husbands of River Song," she later switches to stealing the Doctor's TARDIS instead.

W

Webley Mk. IV, .38/200 calibre Revolver
Captain Jack Harkness' weapon of choice, this gun can be seen on many occasions in many different episodes. He most likely obtained it back when he was living in that time period.

See also
List of Doctor Who items
List of The Sarah Jane Adventures items

Notes

References

Items